Lucena del Cid (in Valencian and also official: Llucena) is a municipality in the comarca of Alcalatén, province of Castellon, Valencian Community, Spain.

References 

Municipalities in the Province of Castellón
Alcalatén